James Lucas (1813 –  21 April 1874) was a celebrated English Victorian eccentric and hermit who gained international renown by his strange way of life. Also a slave holder, he was known as the Hermit of Hertfordshire and Mad Lucas.

Life
Lucas was an amiable, eccentric landowner who was well-educated, had studied medicine and was a good conversationalist. However  his mother's death, in 1849, greatly accentuated his eccentricities. He became a complete recluse, and barricaded himself into his home.

He refused to administer his mother's will, in which he inherited the family estate at Elmwood House near Redcoats Green, Hertfordshire, and deferred burial of her for three months. He developed a paranoid fear of his relatives. He locked himself in his mansion and allowed nothing in the building to be touched. It sank into a dilapidated and decaying condition. He lived solely in the kitchen, sleeping on a bed of ashes and soot. He went naked except for a blanket, enveloped in which he used to appear at his windows. He never washed and his hair grew to waist length. He lived on bread, cheese, eggs, red herrings and gin. His house became infested with rats and he kept his food in baskets hung from the ceiling to protect it from them. He always kept a gun at his side.

Lucas communicated with the world only through an iron grille and employed two armed watchmen who lived in a nearby hut. He was, however, quite willing to receive visitors, mostly tramps and children but increasingly the well-to-do who came to engage him in conversation.

Slave ownership 

According to the Legacies of British Slave-Ownership at the University College London, Lucas was awarded a payment as a slave trader in the aftermath of the Slavery Abolition Act 1833 with the Slave Compensation Act 1837. The British Government took out a £15 million loan (worth £ in ) from Nathan Mayer Rothschild and Moses Montefiore which was subsequently paid off by the British taxpayers (ending in 2015). Lucas was associated with three different claims, two of which were successful, he owned 1121 slaves in British Guiana and Saint Vincent and the Grenadines, he received a £57,970 payment at the time (worth £ in ).

Death and legacy 

Lucas died of apoplexy in 1874, having hoarded a considerable sum of money in his living room.
He is buried in the family grave in Hackney churchyard, London.

After his death 17 cartloads of dirt and ashes were removed from the house.

Lucas is the subject of the song Mad Lucas by The Breeders on their 1993 album, Last Splash.

Notes

References
 From: 'Parishes: Great or Much Wymondley', A History of the County of Hertford: volume 3 (1912), pp. 181–185. URL:  Date accessed: 10 February 2008.
NY Times obituary

External links

James Lucas - Dictionary of National Biography

1813 births
1874 deaths
English hermits
People from Hitchin
Recipients of payments from the Slavery Abolition Act 1833
British slave owners